Pamela Low (March 16, 1928 in Manchester, New Hampshire – June 1, 2007 in New London, New Hampshire) was an American flavorist, best known for developing and creating the flavor coating for Cap'n Crunch breakfast cereal.

Biography 

Pamela Low was the daughter of Kneeland West and Pauline (Smith) Low. She graduated from the Pinkerton Academy in 1946 and studied microbiology at the University of New Hampshire where she graduated in 1951.  She went on to work as a flavorist for the Arthur D. Little consulting firm in the Boston metropolitan area.

She was reportedly asked to develop a flavor for the new Cap'n Crunch cereal in the early 1960s.  Her inspiration for the flavor coating was rice with a sauce composed of butter and brown sugar that her grandmother, Luella Low, used to serve to her family on Sundays as a child in  Derry. Cap'n Crunch was officially unveiled in 1963 and the original recipe has been unchanged since its launch. She is often referred to as the "Grandmother" of Cap'n Crunch. She also worked on the flavors for Almond Joy and Mounds candy bars while at Arthur D. Little, where she worked for 34 years.

Pamela Low lived in New London, New Hampshire since 1973. She was President of the Baptist Women's Fellowship from 1987 to 1988, and of the New London Hospital Auxiliary in 1992. In 1996, she established a scholarship at the University of New Hampshire for students in clinical microbiology. She was also the President of the Women's Golf League of the country club of New Hampshire

Pamela Low died at the New London Hospital in New London, New Hampshire on June 1, 2007 at the age of 79. Her body lies at the Forest Hill Cemetery in East Derry, New Hampshire. Low never married nor did she have kids.

References

External links
 Boston Globe: Pamela Low; kin's treat inspired creation of Cap'n Crunch flavor
Pamela Low, created flavor for Cap'n Crunch, dies at 79
Concord Monitor: Flavorist made it happen: The Cap'n owes it to New Hampshire

1928 births
2007 deaths
Women food scientists
American food scientists
Place of birth missing
20th-century American women scientists
20th-century American scientists
People from New London, New Hampshire
Pinkerton Academy alumni
21st-century American women